Dilong is a Chinese dragon name that is also used to mean "earthworm".

Dilong or Di Long may also refer to:
Di Long (extract), a "Lumbricus rubellus earthworm" preparation in traditional Chinese medicine  
Dilong paradoxus, a genus of small proceratosaurid tyrannosauroid dinosaur
Dilong (Mokokchung), a ward in Mokokchung, Nagaland, India
Ti Lung (born 1946), Hong Kong actor